The National Hotel, also known as the Wolff Building or Hard Time Hotel, is a historic hotel in Westcliffe, Colorado. It was built in 1887 and listed on the National Register of Historic Places in 1987.

It is a two-story brick building, designed in a Romanesque Vernacular style.  It has a rusticated stone front and a high front parapet, and it is the only commercial building on its block.

References

Hotels in Colorado
National Register of Historic Places in Custer County, Colorado
Romanesque Revival architecture in Colorado
Buildings and structures completed in 1887